Two ships of the United States Navy have been named Oahu after Oahu, the third largest of the Hawaiian Islands.

, was launched 26 November 1927 and sunk by enemy torpedoes on 5 May 1942.
, was launched 9 September 1943 and decommissioned in January 1947.

Sources

United States Navy ship names